Jagath Balasuriya (born 21 November 1940) is the Minister of National Heritage in the Sri Lankan government. He belongs to the Sri Lanka Freedom Party. He was acting Governor of Central Province in 2005 from September to December.

References

1940 births
Living people
Governors of Central Province, Sri Lanka
Government ministers of Sri Lanka
Sri Lankan Buddhists
Members of the 14th Parliament of Sri Lanka
Sinhalese politicians